Lubieszewo may refer to the following places:
Lubieszewo, Kuyavian-Pomeranian Voivodeship (north-central Poland)
Lubieszewo, Pomeranian Voivodeship (north Poland)
Lubieszewo, Drawsko County in West Pomeranian Voivodeship (north-west Poland)
Lubieszewo, Gryfice County in West Pomeranian Voivodeship (north-west Poland)